Eugene Stanley Zygowicz (January 1, 1917 – September 23, 2005) was an American professional wrestler, better known by his ring name "Mr. America" Gene Stanlee.

Early life
Zygowicz was born in Chicago, Illinois. His parents, Victoria and Paul Zygowicz, were Polish immigrants. Zygowicz was the eighth child of fifteen—he had eight brothers and six sisters.

When he was five, Zygowicz fell down a set of stairs, and was partially paralyzed. He was given his last rites; however, he regained his health after being partially inspired by seeing a strongman at a church. He began wrestling and competing against other boys when he was eight and collected iron from a railyard to fashion his own homemade gym to develop his physique. By his own count, he claimed to have 165 bodybuilding trophies and 50 gold medals from bodybuilding competitions.

During World War II, Zygowicz, along with his brother Steve, served on a U.S. Navy floating repair ship as a machinist. He reportedly wrestled 134 matches for the entertainment of other servicemen in the South Pacific area during the war. He was termed "pinup boy of the Navy", and once he received his discharge from the Navy, he was sought out by wrestling promoters, who wanted to capitalize on his publicity.

Professional wrestling career
Zygowicz's first professional match was April 26, 1946 in Milwaukee against Leo Kirilenko under the ring name "Gene Stanlee". All his early matches took place in the Chicago–Milwaukee area.

His career as Gene "Mr. America" Stanlee picked up in 1951. After defeating Pat O'Hara on September 24 of that year Gene became NWA Southern Heavyweight Champion, and it was around this time he formed a tag team with his real-life brother Steve Stanlee. Bob Merrill also worked as a kayfabe third brother, Bob Stanlee.

On November 18, 1952, the legendary Lou Thesz faced off with, and defeated Gene Stanlee in 15:14 to retain the NWA World Heavyweight Championship. Stanlee sold out Madison Square Garden over 50 times in his career.

While wrestling for the Midwest Wrestling Association, Stanlee won the Ohio version of the MWA Heavyweight Championship on February 2, 1956. He held the belt for over two months before dropping it to Bobo Brazil on April 19.

In an interview for the Icons of Wrestling program that aired on Canada's Biography Channel, and later Britain's TWC, Stanlee explained his concept of showmanship. "When I walked into the ring, I would add a little showmanship to my style before I wrestled. I noticed that as I was achieving more and more showmanship, I started getting ideas. I seen that the sport was not bringing in women. So I starting glamorizing, thinking up beautiful costumes". Stanlee began wearing ring jackets, which was a rarity in that era, and also had monogrammed towels—"Wrestling's TV King"—which he wore once he took off the ring jacket. His elaborate entrance infuriated opponents, both faces and heels, but also meant he appeared on over 200 magazine covers during his career.

Later life
After retiring from wrestling, Stanlee, who was a health enthusiast and longtime vegetarian, began to sell a line of supplements and later became an advisor and physical trainer for many of Hollywood's great actors and actresses, such as Tom Cruise, Tom Hanks, and Cheryl Tiegs. Gene described himself as the "world's foremost authority on age reversal through blood purification", something that worked well for him as he would go on to still be very active up until the day he died.

Gene had not made a public appearance in over 20 years when he was honored at the Cauliflower Alley Club 2002  reunion in Las Vegas.

Championships and accomplishments
Championship Wrestling from Florida
NWA Southern Heavyweight Championship (Florida version) (1 time)
Midwest Wrestling Association
MWA Heavyweight Championship (Ohio Version) (1 time)
Worldwide Wrestling Associates
WWA International Television Tag Team Championship (1 time) - with Sandor Szabo

References

External links 
 

1917 births
2005 deaths
American male professional wrestlers
People from Chicago
Professional wrestlers from Illinois
20th-century professional wrestlers